Morning Star Multimedia was an American video game company founded in May 1995 by Dan Kitchen.
It was acquired by the Telegen Corporation in 1996 as a wholly owned subsidiary. It was known for releasing Frogger for the Sega Genesis when Majesco rereleased the console in 1998 (known as the Genesis 3). Its last game was released in 2000, so it is unknown whether it is still in the video game industry today. Employees of the company left to form two gaming studios. Half of them went to the Majesco-led Pipe Dream Interactive, while the other half went to OutLook Entertainment, Inc. which developed three games for Game Boy Advance.

Games released

PC
 Weight Trackers Plan and Track (1997, developed)
 Kristi Yamaguchi Fantasy Ice Skating (1998, developed)
 Casper: The Interactive Adventure (1998, developed)

Sega Genesis
 Frogger (1998, developed)

SNES
 Frogger (1998, developed)

Game Boy Color
 Super Breakout (1998, developed)
 Frogger (1998, developed)
 Centipede (1998, published)
 Monopoly (1999, published)
 Black Bass: Lure Fishing (1999, developed)
 10 Pin Bowling (1999, developed)
 Tom and Jerry (1999, developed)
 Battleship (1999, developed)
 Missile Command (1999, developed)
 Deer Hunter (1999, developed)
 Tonka Raceway (1999, developed)
 Pong: The Next Level (1999, developed)
 NASCAR Challenge (1999, developed)
 F-18 Thunder Strike (2000, developed)
 NFL Blitz 2001 (2000, developed)
 Frogger 2: Swampy's Revenge (2000, developed)
 Ultimate Paintball (2000, developed)

Game Boy
 Centipede (1998, published)
 Frogger (1998, published)
 Super Breakout (1998, developed)
 10 Pin Bowling (1998, unpublished)

Game Gear
 Frogger (unpublished)
 Ten-Pin Bowling (unpublished)

References

External links
 https://web.archive.org/web/19981111184228/http://mstarmedia.com/ (Archived)

Video game companies established in 1995
Video game companies disestablished in 2000
Defunct video game companies of the United States